The Bensalem Township School District covers Bensalem Township in Bucks County, Pennsylvania.

Within the district are six elementary schools, two middle schools, and one high school.  The oldest school in the district is Bensalem High School, which was established in 1923, and Cornwells Elementary School is the newest, established in 1998.  Grounds for Cornwells were acquired in six parts, the oldest dating back to 1822.

Elementary schools
 Belmont Elementary School, est. 1970
 Cornwells Elementary School, est. 1998
 Samuel K. Faust Elementary School, est. 1956
 Benjamin Rush Elementary School, est. 1964
 Struble Elementary School, est. 1975
 Valley Elementary School, est. 1975

Middle schools
 Robert K. Shafer Middle School, est. 1980
 Cecelia Snyder Middle School, est. 1958

High school
 Bensalem High School, est. 1923

Charter school
In 1998, the Bensalem Township School Board approved the charter school application for School Lane Charter School. The school opened up on the site of the Old Cornwells Elementary School located in the Eddington section of Bensalem. The school now serves grades K-12 after its recent expansion and celebrated its 20th anniversary in 2018.

References

External links
 Bensalem Township School District website

School districts in Bucks County, Pennsylvania